Caroline Kava (born September 25, 1949) is an American actress and playwright of the 1986 Off-Broadway play, The Early Girl.

She portrayed a prostitute in the 1980 film Heaven's Gate.  In  Year of the Dragon (1985), she portrayed the wife of Mickey Rourke's character.  In Little Nikita (1988), she portrayed the mother of the title character played by River Phoenix.  She also played the mother of Ron Kovic, portrayed by Tom Cruise, in Born on the Fourth of July (1989).  She has also appeared in television films such as Act of Vengeance (1986) and Guilty Until Proven Innocent (1991).  Kava also appeared with Alan Arkin in Four Days in September (1997).

In 2009, Kava adapted Henrik Ibsen's Hedda Gabler for the Mauckingbird Theatre Company in Philadelphia.

Filmography

Film

Television

References

External links

1949 births
Living people
American people of Polish descent
Actresses from Chicago
20th-century American dramatists and playwrights
20th-century American women writers
21st-century American women